Fernando Alva  (born April 12, 1947 in Lima) is a former footballer from Peru. He is the father of Piero Alva.

Honours
Universitario de Deportes
Torneo Descentralizado: 1971
Copa Libertadores runner-up: 1972

References

External links
 Deportivo Municipal 1974 (Spanish)
 Universitario 1970

1947 births
Living people
Footballers from Lima
Peruvian footballers
Peru international footballers
Deportivo Municipal footballers
Club Universitario de Deportes footballers
Club Universidad Nacional footballers
Peruvian expatriate footballers
Association football forwards
Alianza F.C. footballers
C.D. FAS footballers
Once Municipal footballers
Expatriate footballers in El Salvador
Expatriate footballers in Mexico
Peruvian expatriate sportspeople in Mexico